Lauder is a surname of Scottish origin. There are four distinct Lauder families with multiple notable members.

Families with the name Lauder

Lauder Family

 Estée Lauder (person) (1906-2004), founder of Estée Lauder Companies
 Leonard Lauder (son) (b. 1934)
 Ronald Lauder (son) (b. 1944)
 William P. Lauder (grandson)

Lauder Greenway Family

George Lauder Sr. (1815–1901), leader of the Chartism movement in Scotland, progenitor of the Lauder Greenway family
George Lauder (Scottish industrialist) (son) (1837–1924), Scottish billionaire industrialist, partner in the Carnegie Steel Company
George V. Lauder (CIA) (great-grandson) (1924–2012), American intelligence officer with the CIA
George V. Lauder (biologist) (great-great grandson), American biologist, curator at the Museum of Comparative Zoology

Lauder Baronets

Sir John Lauder, 1st Baronet (died 1692)
John Lauder, Lord Fountainhall (1646-1722)
Sir John Lauder, 3rd Baronet (1669-1728)
Sir Alexander Lauder, 4th Baronet (1698-1730)
Sir Andrew Lauder, 5th Baronet (1702-1769)
Sir Andrew Dick-Lauder, 6th Baronet (died 1820)
Sir Thomas Dick Lauder, 7th Baronet (1784-1848)
Sir John Dick-Lauder, 8th Baronet (1813-1867)
Sir Thomas North Dick-Lauder, 9th Baronet (1846-1919)
Sir George William Dalrymple Dick-Lauder, 10th Baronet (1852-1936)
Sir John North Dalrymple Dick-Lauder, 11th Baronet (1883-1958)
Sir George Andrew Dick-Lauder, 12th Baronet (1917-1981)
Sir Piers Robert Dick Lauder, 13th Baronet (born 1947)

Lauders of the Bass

Alexander Lauder (d. 1440), Bishop of Dunkeld
George Lauder (bishop) (died 1466), medieval Scottish bishop
George Lauder of the Bass (died 1611), Scottish administrator
John Lauder (c.1488-??), Scotland's Public Accuser of Heretics
Robert Lauder of Quarrelwood (died c. 1370), Justiciar of Scotia
Robert de Lawedre of Edrington (died 1425), Hostage for King James I of Scotland
Robert Lauder of the Bass (c. 1440 – 1508), armiger, and governor of the castle at Berwick-upon-Tweed
Robert Lauder of the Bass (died 1576) (c. 1504 – 1576), Lord of The Bass and land magnate in Haddingtonshire, Berwickshire, and Fife
Robert Lauder of Popill (died 1575), member of the old Scottish Parliament
Robert Lauder of Beilmouth (died 1709), armiger, lawyer, and Clerk of Exchequer in Scotland
Thomas Lauder (1395-1481), Scottish churchman
William de Lauder (1380–1425), bishop of Glasgow

Other people with the surname Lauder
 Abram William Lauder (1834-1884), Canadian lawyer and politician
 Afferbeck Lauder pseudonym of Alastair Ardoch Morrison (1911-1998), Australian graphic artist
 Alexander Lauder of Blyth (d. 1513), Provost of Edinburgh (1500-1513)
 Andrew Lauder b 1952 Music executive and record label founder 
 Colin Lauder (1750-1831), Fellow of the Royal College of Surgeons, Edinburgh
 David Ross Lauder (1894-1972), Scottish Victoria Cross recipient
 George Lauder (disambiguation)
 Harry Lauder (1870-1950), Scottish music-hall entertainer
 Hayley Lauder (born 1990), Scottish association footballer
 James Eckford Lauder (1811-1869), Scottish artist
 John Lauder (surgeon) (1683-1737), surgeon to George Heriot's Hospital
 Maria Elise Turner Lauder (1833–1922), Canadian writer
 Robert Lauder (disambiguation)
 William Lauder (disambiguation)

Fictional characters
Jack Lauder, the murder victim in the mystery game The Shivah.

References

Surnames of Scottish origin
Lauder family
Lauder Greenway Family